Alain Carpentier de Changy (born in Brussels, 5 February 1922 – died in Etterbeek, 5 August 1994) was a racing driver from Belgium. His single Formula One World Championship Grand Prix attempt was at the 1959 Monaco Grand Prix with a Cooper run by Ecurie Nationale Belge, but he failed to qualify. He was more successful in sports car racing.

Complete Formula One World Championship results
(key)

See also

 Carpentier family

References

"The Grand Prix Who's Who", Steve Small, 1996

Belgian racing drivers
Belgian Formula One drivers
Ecurie Nationale Belge Formula One drivers
1922 births
1994 deaths
24 Hours of Le Mans drivers
World Sportscar Championship drivers
Racing drivers from Brussels